Pasar Jawa LRT station is an elevated light rapid transit (LRT) station and serves as one of the stations for the Shah Alam line. The station is located in the city of Klang, Selangor one of the world's major international port cities and as global transhipment hub of Malaysia. The station is surrounded by most of the major landmarks in the areas are business and commercial districts of Klang North as compared to South Klang which is mostly government departments. This station mainly serves urban localities that use Lebuhraya Persekutuan, Jalan Meru, Jalan Kapar and Jalan Langat which are the four major roads servicing the area.

The station is an elevated rapid transit station in forming part of the Klang Valley Integrated Transit System. Although not designated as an official interchange, commuters may walk up to the  Klang Komuter Station on the Port Klang Line from Klang LRT line. It takes approximately 5 – 10 minutes walking time.

Initial Planning
The station was planned to be built near to the current KTM Klang Komuter Station at Klang South near to Jalan Tengku Kelana Klang, Little India. However, since the planned location was in a busy district, residents opposed the location mainly for historical importance since it required demolishing parts of pre-war shop lots and some other businesses in the narrow roads. The location of the station was then changed to a new location in North Klang near to Jalan Pasar where the major business district in Klang is located. The new location is next to Klang infamous Emporium Makan, which due to construction difficulties, necessitated the building to be demolished in order for the station to be built. This has left Klang LRT and Klang KTM Komuter stations not being an interchange station, rather just a connecting station which is about 700 metres walking distance using Jambatan Musaeddin.

Surrounding Area
Plaza MPK (Mydin Klang Utara)
Hentian Bas Klang
Masjid Diraja Klang
Kolej Hafiz
Arked Mara
Klang City Square
Klang Digital Mall
Aliya Hotel
GOCOS Hotel
First Tower (LHDN Klang)
Hospital Wanita IVF Metro
Klang Commercial Convention Center (KCCC)
KO Skin Specialist
Confort Hotel
B Hotel
Family Hotel
GFG Tower Co-Working
Klang High School
Pin Hwa High School
Sri KDU International School
Berkeley Uptown Residence
Kg Bukit Kuda

References

External links
 LRT3 Bandar Utama–Klang line

Klang (city)
Rapid transit stations in Selangor
Shah Alam Line